Roman Bengez (22 February 1964 – 2 July 2013) was a Slovenian footballer and manager.

He played for Slovenian clubs Olimpija and Ljubljana, both of which he later managed in the Slovenian First League.

References

External links
PrvaLiga profile 

1964 births
2013 deaths
Yugoslav footballers
Slovenian footballers
Association football forwards
NK Olimpija Ljubljana (1945–2005) players
NK Ljubljana players
Slovenian football managers
NK Olimpija Ljubljana (1945–2005) managers
NK Ljubljana managers
Slovenian PrvaLiga players